Mihai Andrei Panait (born 16 May 1989) is a Romanian professional footballer who plays as a midfielder for Liga I club CS Mioveni . In his career, Panait also played for teams such as: Școala de Fotbal Dănuț Coman, CS Mioveni or Muscelul Câmpulung, among others.

Honours
Argeș Pitești
Liga II: 2007–08
Liga III: 2016–17

References

External links
 
 

1989 births
Living people
People from Argeș County
Romanian footballers
Association football midfielders
Liga I players
Liga II players
Liga III players
FC Argeș Pitești players
CS Mioveni players